Walker Lee Ashley (born July 28, 1960) is a retired American football linebacker who played in the National Football League for the Minnesota Vikings and Kansas City Chiefs.

College career
Ashley was a member of the 1982 Penn State National Championship team and an All American defensive end.

Professional career
Ashley played linebacker for the Minnesota Vikings from 1983 to 1988 and again in 1990 after a one-year stint with the Kansas City Chiefs in 1989.

Personal life
Ashley was born in Bayonne, New Jersey. Raised in Jersey City, New Jersey, Ashley attended Henry Snyder High School.

His son, also Walker Lee Ashley, played football for the USC Trojans for one season and left the program.

References

1960 births
Living people
Henry Snyder High School alumni
Sportspeople from Bayonne, New Jersey
Players of American football from Jersey City, New Jersey
American football linebackers
Penn State Nittany Lions football players
Minnesota Vikings players
Kansas City Chiefs players
Ed Block Courage Award recipients